Morayfield railway station is located on the North Coast line in Queensland, Australia. It serves the suburb of Morayfield in the Moreton Bay Region. It opened in 1888.

Services
Morayfield station is served by all City network services from Nambour and Caboolture to Central, many continuing to Springfield Central, Ipswich and Rosewood.

Services by platform

References

External links

Morayfield station Queensland Rail
Morayfield station Queensland's Railways on the Internet

Railway stations in Australia opened in 1888
Railway stations in Moreton Bay Region
Morayfield, Queensland
North Coast railway line, Queensland